Nicrophorus argutor is a species of burying beetle found in Russia, Mongolia, China and Kazakhstan.

References 

 

Silphidae
Insects of China
Insects of Central Asia
Insects of Mongolia
Insects of Russia
Beetles described in 1890